Treninnick is a southeastern suburb of Newquay, Cornwall, England, United Kingdom, near Trencreek. It is in the civil parish of Crantock.

References

Villages in Cornwall